This is a list of German football transfers in the winter transfer window 2015–16 by club. Only transfers of the Bundesliga, and 2. Bundesliga are included.

Bundesliga
Note: Flags indicate national team as has been defined under FIFA eligibility rules. Players may hold more than one non-FIFA nationality.

FC Bayern Munich

In:

Out:

VfL Wolfsburg

In:

Out:

Borussia Mönchengladbach

In:

Out:

Bayer 04 Leverkusen

In:

Out:

FC Augsburg

In:

Out:

FC Schalke 04

In:

Out:

Borussia Dortmund

In:

Out:

1899 Hoffenheim

In:

Out:

Eintracht Frankfurt

In:

Out:

Werder Bremen

In:

Out:

1. FSV Mainz 05

In:

Out:

1. FC Köln

In:

Out:

Hannover 96

In:

Out:

VfB Stuttgart

In:

Out:

Hertha BSC

In:

Out:

Hamburger SV

In:

Out:

FC Ingolstadt 04

In:

Out:

SV Darmstadt 98

In:

Out:

2. Bundesliga

SC Freiburg

In:

Out:

SC Paderborn 07

In:

Out:

Karlsruher SC

In:

Out:

1. FC Kaiserslautern

In:

Out:

RB Leipzig

In:                                       

 
 
Out:

Eintracht Braunschweig

In:

Out:

1. FC Union Berlin

In:

Out:

1. FC Heidenheim

In:

Out:

1. FC Nürnberg

In:

Out:

Fortuna Düsseldorf

In:

Out:

VfL Bochum

In:

Out:

SV Sandhausen

In:

Out:

FSV Frankfurt

In:

Out:

SpVgg Greuther Fürth

In:

Out:

FC St. Pauli

In:

Out:

1860 Munich

In:

Out:

Arminia Bielefeld

In:

Out:

MSV Duisburg

In:

Out:

See also
 2015–16 Bundesliga
 2015–16 2. Bundesliga

References

External links
 Official site of the DFB 
 Kicker.de 
 Official site of the Bundesliga 
 Official site of the Bundesliga

Football transfers winter 2015–16
Trans
2015-16